The Yamaha Rhino is an off-road vehicle produced by Yamaha Motor Company from 2004 to 2012. It was designed for a driver and passenger with two-wheel drive and four-wheel drive. Built at Yamaha’s factory in Newnan, Georgia, it is classified as a Side-by-side, UTV or ROV (Recreational off-highway vehicle). 

The Recreational Off-Highway Vehicle Association defines ROV's as “motorized off-road vehicles designed to travel on four or more non-highway tires, with a steering wheel, non-straddle seating, seat belts, an occupant protective structure, and engine displacement up to 1,000cc (for gasoline - fuelled

led engines).”

2009 Free Repair Program 
On March 31, 2009, the U.S. Consumer Product Safety Commission (CPSC) announced a repair program for Rhino 660 and 450 models. Yamaha subsequently and voluntarily included the same offer for Rhino 700 models in order to reduce confusion and ensure customer satisfaction. According to the CPSC, the following two repairs were needed “to help reduce the chance of rollover and improve vehicle handling better”:
 Installation of a two-inch spacer on each of the rear wheels
 Removal of the rear anti-sway bar

Yamaha also announced that same day that the company was temporarily suspending sales of the Rhino until the affected models could be repaired, and the CPSC advised owners not to operate the vehicles until taking them to a dealership for the modifications.  All subsequent Rhino 450, 660 and 70l0 models have the same modifications.  The sales suspension lasted less than two months.

Competitors
Other main competitors of the Rhino include the Polaris Ranger, Polaris RZR, Arctic Cat Prowler, Honda Pioneer, Kawasaki Teryx 750 4x4, the Can-Am Commander and the John Deere Gator.

External links
Yamaha Motor Corporation
Recreational Off-Highway Vehicle Association

References 

Rhino
Off-road vehicles